Jagjit Singh Kular (1 January 1944 – 16 November 2010) was a field hockey player from India. He competed at the 1964 Summer Olympics, the 1966 Asian Games, and the 1968 Summer Olympics.

References

External links

1944 births
2010 deaths
Field hockey players from Jalandhar
Indian male field hockey players
Olympic field hockey players of India
Olympic gold medalists for India
Olympic bronze medalists for India
Olympic medalists in field hockey
Medalists at the 1964 Summer Olympics
Medalists at the 1968 Summer Olympics
Field hockey players at the 1964 Summer Olympics
Field hockey players at the 1968 Summer Olympics
Asian Games medalists in field hockey
Field hockey players at the 1966 Asian Games
Asian Games gold medalists for India
Medalists at the 1966 Asian Games
Recipients of the Arjuna Award